Scott George Brown is a Canadian bassist best known for being a member of the Canadian rock band Trooper. He has also done work with vocalist Paul Laine, both as a solo artist and with Danger Danger.

Brown joined Trooper in 1996 and has toured with the band ever since, making him one of the longest-running members in the band's history. Brown was featured when Trooper performed in the 2010 Olympics Victory Ceremonies in Vancouver, British Columbia on 21 February 2010. Coverage of the event was broadcast in Canada and around the world on networks such as CTV and MuchMusic.

Brown currently resides on Vancouver Island, and continues to perform with Trooper. When he is not touring with Trooper he performs solo and duo acoustic shows on Vancouver Island and throughout the lower mainland.

References

External links 
 
 

Danger Danger members
Living people
Year of birth missing (living people)